Werner Bischof  (26 April 1916 – 16 May 1954) was a Swiss photographer and photojournalist. He became a full member of Magnum Photos in 1949, the first new photographer to join its original founders. Bischof's book Japan (1954) was awarded the Prix Nadar in 1955.

Life and work
Bischof was born in Zürich, Switzerland. When he was six years old, the family moved to Waldshut, Germany, where he subsequently went to school. In 1932, having abandoned studies to become a teacher, he enrolled at the Kunstgewerbeschule in Zürich. While there he studied alongside . He graduated cum laude in 1936. 

From 1939 on, he worked as an independent photographer for various magazines, in particular, du, based in Zürich. He travelled extensively from 1945 to 1949 through nearly all European countries from France to Romania and from Norway to Greece. His works on the devastation in post-war Europe established him as one of the foremost photojournalists of his time.

He was associated into Magnum Photos in 1948 and became a full member in 1949. At that time Magnum was composed of just five other photographers, its founders Robert Capa, Henri Cartier-Bresson, George Rodger, David Seymour, and Ernst Haas. 

The focus of much of Bischof's post-war humanist photography was showing the poverty and despair around him in Europe, tempered with his desire to travel the world, conveying the beauty of nature and humanity.

Of photography, Bischof said - 

In 1951, he went to India, freelancing for Life, and then to Japan and Korea. For Paris Match he worked as a war reporter in Vietnam. In 1954, he travelled through Mexico and Panama, before flying to Peru, where he embarked on a trip through the Andes to the Amazonas on 14 May. On 16 May 1954 his car fell off a cliff on a mountain road in the Andes, and all three passengers were killed.

Publications

Publications by Bischof

Japan. Zurich: Manesse, 1954. 
Japan. London: Sylvan, 1954. New York: Simon & Schuster, 1954.
Japon. Paris: Delpire, 1954. 
 Indiens Pas Mort,(with Pierre Verger and Robert Frank), Zurich: Conzett & Huber, 1956.
 Carnet de Route.Zurich: Conzett & Huber, 1957.
Werner Bischof: Europa 1945 – 1950. Zürich: Tages-Anzeiger, 1990. 
After the War. Washington, D.C.: Smithsonian, 1997. . Foreword by Miriam Mafai.
Werner Bischof. Phaidon 55's. London: Phaidon, 2001. . Text by Claude Cookman.
Questions to My Father: A Tribute to Werner Bischof. London: Trolley, 2004. . Edited by Marco Bischof.

Publications about Bischof
Werner Bischof, 1916–1954 His Life and Work. London: Thames and Hudson, 1990. . By Marco Bischof and Rene Burri. With an introduction by Hugo Loetscher and text by Marco Bishof and Guido Magnaguagno.

Awards
1955: His book Japon (Japan) won the Prix Nadar

References

External links
Werner Bischof Estate

1916 births
1954 deaths
Artists from Zürich
Magnum photographers
Road incident deaths in Peru
Life (magazine) photojournalists
Paris Match photojournalists
Photography in Japan
Photography in Korea
Photography in Vietnam
Swiss photojournalists
Road incident deaths in Bolivia
Zurich University of the Arts alumni
20th-century Swiss photographers
Humanist photographers